Ely Municipal Airport  is a public airport located in Saint Louis County, Minnesota, United States, four miles south of the city of Ely, which owns the airport.

Most U.S. airports use the same three-letter location identifier for the FAA and IATA, but Ely Municipal Airport is ELO to the FAA and LYU to the IATA (Eldorado, Misiones, Argentina has IATA code ELO).

Facilities

For the year ending May 31, 2014 the airport had 8,200 aircraft operations, an average of 22 per day: 98% general aviation and 2% air taxi.

In January 2017, there were 14 aircraft based at this airport: 13 single-engine and 1 multi-engine.

Past airline service
From 1995 through 2002 Mesaba Airlines, operating as Northwest Airlink on behalf of Northwest Airlines, provided service between Ely and Minneapolis/Saint Paul during the summer months. The once daily flight was operated with a Saab 340 aircraft.

References

External links 
  

Airports in Minnesota
Buildings and structures in Ely, Minnesota
Transportation in St. Louis County, Minnesota